Bruna Grigoriadis Orphao (born March 10, 1999), best known as Bruna Griphao, is a Brazilian actress of Greek descent. She was born and raised in Rio de Janeiro, Brazil. Griphao is fluent in Portuguese, Spanish, English and Greek. Her maternal grandparents are from Greece and Chile.

Personal life 
In Big Brother Brasil 23, Bruna came out as heteroaffective bisexual.

Filmography

Television

Film

References

External links
 

1999 births
Living people
Actresses from Rio de Janeiro (city)
Brazilian people of Greek descent
Brazilian television actresses
Brazilian film actresses
Brazilian child actresses
Big Brother (franchise) contestants
Big Brother Brasil
21st-century Brazilian actresses

Bisexual actresses
Brazilian LGBT actors
Brazilian bisexual people